A person must be at least be 21 years of age to publicly drink an alcoholic beverage in Texas, with some exceptions

Texas is one of ten states (California, Colorado, Maryland, Montana, New York, Texas, West Virginia, Washington, Wisconsin, and Wyoming) that allow consumption by minors in the presence of consenting and supervising family members. In the state of Texas, parents accept responsibility for the safety of minors under 18 when the minor is on their property or on property leased by them and under their care, custody, and control; an adult may provide alcohol to a minor if they are the minor's adult parent, guardian, or spouse, and is visibly present when the minor possesses or consumes the alcoholic beverage. It is against the law to make alcohol available to a non-family person younger than 21, even in one's own residence and even with that parent's permission.

Texas holds parents/adults civilly liable for damages caused by the intoxication of a minor younger than 18 if they knowingly provided alcohol or allowed alcohol to be served on property owned or leased by them and the minor:
is injured or dies as a result of drinking on the property,
gets into a fight, falls and hurts themself, or is sexually assaulted,
damages someone else's property, or
leaves and is involved in a motor vehicle accident and causes injury to themselves or others.

An operator of a motor vehicle is considered automatically under the influence of alcohol if a chemical screening shows a blood-alcohol content (BAC) of 0.08 percent or greater. If under the age of 21, a driver in Texas is not able to test positive for any blood-alcohol content (BAC) under penalty of DUI charges.

Alcohol sales 
Voter approval is required (either at the county, county precinct, or city level) to approve sales.  Separate votes are required for 1) "on premise" (sales at a restaurant or bar for consumption at that location) beer and wine sales, 2) "off premise" (sales for consumption elsewhere, such as home) beer and wine sales, 3) on premise liquor sales, and 4) off premise liquor sales.

Only five Texas counties are completely "dry" counties, where no sales of alcoholic beverages are legal anywhere in the county:

Many counties are completely "wet" counties, where all alcoholic beverage sales are legal everywhere in the county:

All others are "moist" counties, which are a combination of wet and dry areas.

Sales of alcohol
Beer and wine can be sold from 7:00 AM until midnight Monday through Friday, from 7:00 AM until 1:00 AM on Saturday, and from 10am until midnight on Sunday. Licensed restaurants, bars, and other establishments can additionally serve for consumption on-premises starting at 10:00 AM on Sunday if served with food, and until 2:00 AM every night if the establishment has a late-hours permit in a city or county that allows late-hours sales.

Liquor sales are more stringently regulated.  Liquor sales are prohibited 1) on Sundays, 2) on Thanksgiving Day, Christmas Day, and New Year's Day (and when Christmas and New Year's fall on a Sunday, the prohibition is carried over to the following Monday), and 3) before 10AM and after 9PM on any other day.  Furthermore, liquor can only be sold in "package stores", which must be closed whenever liquor sales are prohibited (even for sales of otherwise allowable products), and which further must be physically separated from any other business.  Moreover, no owner can own more than 250 package stores, and no publicly traded company can own such a store.

Hotel bars can serve alcohol to registered guests at all hours.

Legitimate age
People must be at least 21 years of age to legally consume alcoholic beverages in Texas with certain exceptions, as in any other state in the United States. However, employment at a company serving alcoholic beverages can be entered into at age 18 provided they get certified by the Texas Alcoholic Beverage Commission.

No specific training is required to serve alcohol; however, the Texas Alcoholic Beverage Code states that the actions of an employee (such as serving alcohol to a clearly intoxicated patron) will not be imputed to the employer if 1) the employer requires the employee to complete training approved by the Texas Alcoholic Beverage Commission, 2) the employee actually completes the training, and 3) the employer has not directly encouraged the employee to violate the law.

Open container laws 
All previously opened containers of alcoholic beverages must be stored and transported in a vehicle's trunk (or behind the last row of seats in the case a vehicle does not have a partitioned trunk) or other storage to which the driver and or any passengers do not have access.

Blood alcohol content limits 
An operator of a motor vehicle is considered under the influence of alcohol if a chemical screening test shows a blood-alcohol content of 0.08 percent or higher. No other evidence (such as Field Sobriety tests) need be presented to the court to obtain a DUI (driving under the influence) conviction. 
A driver testing 0.15 percent or more over the legal limit of 0.08 percent faces more severe penalties for enhanced BAC. 
When under the age of 21, a driver in Texas must not test positive for any blood-alcohol content (BAC) and may be charged with DUI even if the amount tested is under 0.08 percent.

See also 
 Law of Texas

References

External links 
 alcohollaws.org
 tabc.state.tx.us

Texas
Texas law